Juana Salabert (born 1962) is a Spanish writer, journalist, literary critic and translator. She is the winner of Premio Biblioteca Breve 2001 and the runner-up for Premio Nadal 1996.

Early life and education 
She was born in 1962, in Paris, where her parents lived in exile from Francoist dictatorship. Her father was the journalist Miguel Salabert. She completed a philology degree at the Université de Toulouse-Le Mirail.

Career 
Salabert writes in Spanish and her body of work includes novels, short stories, a travel book and a children's book. Her writings often deal with the history and the aftermath of World War II or the Spanish Civil War, or touch upon the history of displacement of her own family. She debuted in 1996 with Varadero, followed by Arde lo que será which was published the same year and was the runner-up for the Premio Nadal. Her 2001 novel Velódromo de invierno, which described the horrors of Nazism through the eyes of a child, was awarded with Premio Biblioteca Breve.

Salabert was the finalist for Rómulo Gallegos Prize (2011), Premio Dulce Chacón (2005), National Literature Prize for Narrative (2005) and Premio Dashiell Hammett (2008).

Apart from writing longer forms, Salabert has also written for the press, including texts of literary criticism, as well as worked as a literary translator.

Works 

 Varadero, 1996
 Arde lo que será, 1996
 Mar de los espejos, 1998
 Aire nada más, 1999
 Estación central, 1999
 La bruja marioneta, 2001 (children's book)
 Velódromo del invierno, 2001
 La noche ciega, 2004
 Hijas de la ira, 2005
 El bulevar del miedo, 2007
 Cuentos de amigas, 2009
 La faz de la tierra, 2011
 La regla del oro, 2015
 Atentado, 2022

References 

1962 births
Living people
20th-century Spanish women writers
21st-century Spanish women writers
20th-century Spanish novelists
21st-century Spanish novelists
Writers from Paris